The Women's 30 kilometre classical interval start cross-country skiing competition at the 2002 Winter Olympics in Salt Lake City, United States, was held on 24 February at Soldier Hollow. This was the final women's event of the 2002 Olympics cross-country program.

All skiers started at 30 second intervals, skiing the entire 30 kilometre course.

The race
The early leader in this race was Russian Larisa Lazutina, the 1999 World Champion and 2001 Holmenkollen champion in the event. She won the race by almost two minutes over Italian Gabriella Paruzzi. Lazutina led at every checkpoint and had the fastest intermediate split for each time check. Stefania Belmondo of Italy finished third and Norwegian Bente Skari finished in fourth place.

After the competition, it was confirmed that Lazutina had tested positive for darpopoietin, an erythropoietin analogue, and was disqualified from all events in the 2002 Winter Olympics. Her teammate, Olga Danilova, who had originally finished eighth had been sanctioned for doping two months earlier and was also disqualified. This brought Paruzzi up to gold medal, her first individual olympic medal. The silver medalist became Italy's Stefania Belmondo while Skari won the bronze. For Belmondo this was her 10th Olympic medal, equaling the Winter Olympic record for women held by Soviet/Unified Team skier Raisa Smetanina, both trailing only Norway's Bjørn Dæhlie, who won 12.

Results 
The race was started at 09:30.

References

Women's cross-country skiing at the 2002 Winter Olympics
Women's 30 kilometre cross-country skiing at the Winter Olympics